Asandhamitra was a queen and chief consort of the Mauryan emperor Ashoka The Great. She was Ashoka's second wife and first queen consort

Given the title "agramahisi", or "Chief Queen", Asandhimitra was likely from a royal family. She did not have any children. After her death, Tishyarakshita became the chief queen of Ashoka.

Life
She was born in the kingdom of Asandivat (Today’s Assandh).

According to Maha Bodhi Society, she was married to Ashoka during c. 270-240 BC. She was a trusted, faithful, and favourite wife of Ashoka. She is often referred to as his "beloved" or his "dear" consort and is said to have been a trusted adviser of the king. At her death in c. 240 BC, Ashoka was deeply grieved.

Karmic legends
The Mahavamsa tells a legend of how she became queen, stating that she became Ashoka's queen because in a previous life, she had given directions to a pratyekabuddha who was looking for a honey merchant. The story says that after the merchant filled his bowl completely with honey, the pratyekabuddha made a vow to become the lord of Jambudvipa. After hearing this, she herself wished they would be reborn as King and Queen, leading them to be reborn as Ashoka and Asandhimitra.

In the Extended Mahavamsa, a story is additionally told that in a separate past life, Asandhimitra gave a pratyekabuddha a piece of cloth, which is thought to have given her the status of Queen, karmically independent of Asoka.

In the Dasavatthuppakarana, it combines both stories into one, telling the story of the pratyekabuddha and the honey merchant and adding that Asandhimitra's past self gifted the same pratyekabuddha with a piece of cloth.

References

 Allen, Charles (2012). Ashoka: The Search for India's Lost Emperor. Hachette. .

Ashoka
Mauryan empresses